Siddiqua Fatima Zahra Mosque is a mosque located in the Dahiya Abdullah Mubarak community, near the Kuwait International Airport, in Kuwait.

Construction and Architecture
The work was started in February 2008 and was completed in June 2011. The total area is 3200 square meters, which can hold around 3500 men with a separate area for 500 women. Four minarets stand 33 meters tall (42 meters from the ground), and there is a dome 16 meters wide and 22 meters high. The marble was imported from Iran, and the marble was worked on by Iranian and Indian artisans working 24/7 for 8 months. The mosque was designed in the style of the Taj Mahal India .

See also
 habeeb al kazemi

References

Mosques in Kuwait